Polmak is a former municipality in Finnmark county, Norway.  The  municipality existed from 1903 until its dissolution in 1964.  The administrative centre was the village of Polmak where Polmak Church is located.

The municipality of Polmak stretched along the northern shore of the Tana River (which also forms the border with Finland) from the little village of Leavvajohka in the west to the village of Polmak in the east and then it continues on both sides of the Tana River northwards to the Tana Bridge. The municipality included the upper Tana River valley, along the border with Finland.

History
The municipality of Polmak was established on 1 January 1903 when the large municipality of Nesseby was divided in two:  Polmak (population: 450) in the west and Nesseby (population: 1,058) in the east.  During the 1960s, there were many municipal mergers across Norway due to the work of the Schei Committee.  On 1 January 1964, the neighboring municipalities of Polmak (population: 1,072) and Tana (population: 2,237) were merged to form a new, larger Tana Municipality.

Government

Municipal council
The municipal council  of Polmak was made up of representatives that were elected to four year terms.  The party breakdown of the final municipal council was as follows:

See also
List of former municipalities of Norway

References

Tana, Norway
Former municipalities of Norway
1903 establishments in Norway
1964 disestablishments in Norway